wolfSSL is a small, portable, embedded SSL/TLS library targeted for use by embedded systems developers. It is an open source implementation of TLS (SSL 3.0, TLS 1.0, 1.1, 1.2, 1.3, and DTLS 1.0, 1.2, and 1.3) written in the C programming language. It includes SSL/TLS client libraries and an SSL/TLS server implementation as well as support for multiple APIs, including those defined by SSL and TLS. wolfSSL also includes an OpenSSL compatibility interface with the most commonly used OpenSSL functions.

A predecessor of wolfSSL, yaSSL is a C++ based SSL library for embedded environments and real time operating systems with constrained resources.

Platforms
wolfSSL is currently available for Win32/64, Linux, macOS, Solaris, ESP32, ESP8266, Threadx, VxWorks, FreeBSD, NetBSD, OpenBSD, embedded Linux, Yocto Project, OpenEmbedded, WinCE, Haiku, OpenWrt, iPhone, Android, Nintendo Wii and Gamecube through DevKitPro support, QNX, MontaVista, Tron variants, NonStop OS, OpenCL, Micrium's MicroC/OS-II, FreeRTOS, SafeRTOS, Freescale MQX, Nucleus, TinyOS, TI-RTOS, HP-UX, uTasker, uT-kernel, embOS, INtime, mbed, RIOT, CMSIS-RTOS, FROSTED, Green Hills INTEGRITY, Keil RTX, TOPPERS, PetaLinux, Apache Mynewt, and PikeOS.

History
The genesis of yaSSL, or yet another SSL, dates to 2004. OpenSSL was available at the time, and was dual licensed under the OpenSSL License and the SSLeay license.  yaSSL, alternatively, was developed and dual-licensed under both a commercial license and the GPL.  yaSSL offered a more modern API, commercial style developer support and was complete with an OpenSSL compatibility layer.  The first major user of wolfSSL/CyaSSL/yaSSL was MySQL. Through bundling with MySQL, yaSSL has achieved extremely high distribution volumes in the millions.

In February 2019, Daniel Stenberg, the creator of cURL, joined the wolfSSL project.

Protocols

The wolfSSL lightweight SSL library implements the following protocols:
 SSL 3.0, TLS 1.0, TLS 1.1, TLS 1.2, TLS 1.3
 DTLS 1.0, DTLS 1.2, DTLS 1.3
 Extensions: Server Name Indication (SNI), Maximum Fragment Length, Truncated HMAC, Application Layer Protocol Negotiation (ALPN), Extended Master Secret
 Ciphersuites: TLS Secure Remote Password, TLS Pre-Shared Key
 Post-quantum cryptography: QSH (quantum-safe handshake) 
 Public Key Cryptography Standards: 
 PKCS #1 - RSA Cryptography
 PKCS #3 - Diffie-Hellman Key Agreement
 PKCS #5 - Password-Based Encryption
 PKCS #7 - Cryptographic Message Syntax (CMS)
 PKCS #8 - Private-Key Information Syntax
 PKCS #9 - Selected Attribute Types
 PKCS #10 - Certificate signing request (CSR)
 PKCS #11 - Cryptographic Token Interface
 PKCS #12 - Certificate/Personal Information Exchange Syntax Standard

Protocol Notes:
 SSL 2.0 – SSL 2.0 was deprecated (prohibited) in 2011 by RFC 6176. wolfSSL does not support it.
 SSL 3.0 – SSL 3.0 was deprecated (prohibited) in 2015 by RFC 7568. In response to the POODLE attack, SSL 3.0 has been disabled by default since wolfSSL 3.6.6, but can be enabled with a compile-time option.

Algorithms
wolfSSL uses the following cryptography libraries:

wolfCrypt
By default, wolfSSL uses the cryptographic services provided by wolfCrypt.  wolfCrypt Provides RSA, ECC, DSS, Diffie–Hellman, EDH, NTRU, DES, Triple DES, AES (CBC, CTR, CCM, GCM), Camellia, IDEA, ARC4, HC-128, ChaCha20, MD2, MD4, MD5, SHA-1, SHA-2, SHA-3, BLAKE2, RIPEMD-160, Poly1305, Random Number Generation, Large Integer support, and base 16/64 encoding/decoding. An experimental cipher called Rabbit, a public domain software stream cipher from the EU's eSTREAM project, is also included. Rabbit is potentially useful to those encrypting streaming media in high performance, high demand environments.

wolfCrypt also includes support for the recent Curve25519 and Ed25519 algorithms.

wolfCrypt acts as a back-end crypto implementation for several popular software packages and libraries, including MIT Kerberos (where it can be enabled using a build option).

NTRU
CyaSSL+ includes NTRU public key encryption. The addition of NTRU in CyaSSL+ was a result of the partnership between yaSSL and Security Innovation. NTRU works well in mobile and embedded environments due to the reduced bit size needed to provide the same security as other public key systems. In addition, it's not known to be vulnerable to quantum attacks. Several cipher suites utilizing NTRU are available with CyaSSL+ including AES-256, RC4, and HC-128.

Hardware Integration

Secure Element Support 
wolfSSL supports the following Secure Elements:

 STMicroelectronics STSAFE
 Microchip CryptoAuthentication ATECC508A
 NXP EdgeLock SE050 Secure Element

Technology Support 
wolfSSL supports the following hardware technologies:
 Intel SGX (Software Guard Extensions)  - Intel SGX allows a smaller attack surface and has been shown to provide a higher level of security for executing code without a significant impact on performance.

Hardware Encryption Support 
The following tables list wolfSSL's support for using various devices' hardware encryption with various algorithms. 

- "All" denotes 128, 192, and 256-bit supported block sizes

Certifications
wolfSSL supports the following certifications:
 Federal Information Processing Standards (FIPS 140)
 FIPS 140-2
 wolfCrypt FIPS Module: 3.6.0 (NIST certificate #2425) - Historical
 wolfCrypt FIPS Module: 4.0 (NIST certificate #3389)
 Radio Technical Commission for Aeronautics (RTCA)
 DO-178C
 wolfCrypt COTS DO-178C certification kit (DAL A)

Licensing
wolfSSL is dual licensed: 
 Licensed under the GPL-2.0-or-later license. This is good for GPL open source projects and evaluation.
 Licensed under a commercial non-GPL license. This comes with additional support and maintenance packages and is priced at 6,000 USD per product or SKU as of 2022.

See also

Transport Layer Security
Comparison of TLS implementations
Comparison of cryptography libraries
GnuTLS
Network Security Services
OpenSSL

References

External links
 wolfSSL/CyaSSL Homepage
 wolfSSL Now With ChaCha20 and Poly1305

C (programming language) libraries
Cryptographic software
Transport Layer Security implementation